The Maine State Library is an agency of the State of Maine and located in Augusta, Maine.

History 
The Maine State Library began when the Maine Legislature authorized the purchase of books in 1836 and as a result, the State Library began to grow. It is “the principle depository for all state documents...” The Maine State Library distinguishes itself in that it is not only strategically located, but it provides resources and services to citizens and librarians alike. It is guided by the Maine Library Commission, a 17-member board that is appointed by the Governor. The members represent the “State's libraries and ensure geographic diversity and broad individual experiences” and “establishes the policies and operations of the State Library, gives advice and makes recommendations on the expenditure of state and federal funds, and establishes guidelines and policies for statewide library programs." The Maine State Library adheres to its mission in a hands-on approach. It is shifting from its more traditional role of collecting and selecting information to now “facilitate, organize, and access information.”

Divisions 
 Public and Outreach Services, Research & Innovation Division (Alison Maxell)
 Library Development Division (Janet McKenney)
 Collection Development, Digital Initiatives and Promotion (Adam Fisher)

Top Programs 
 Digital Maine Library Resources (DML)
 Area Reference and Resource Services (ARRCS)
 Maine InfoNet Statewide Systems Resource
 Interlibrary Loan Van Delivery
 Historical Preservation Initiatives and Access

References

External links

Libraries in Kennebec County, Maine
Buildings and structures in Augusta, Maine
State libraries of the United States
1836 establishments in Maine
Libraries established in 1836